The crimson-fronted parakeet (Psittacara finschi), also known as  Finsch's parakeet or Finsch's conure, is a small green Neotropical parrot. It is found in Nicaragua, Costa Rica and western Panama. Its natural habitats are subtropical or tropical moist lowland forest and heavily degraded former forest.

Taxonomy 
Like other Psittacara species, it was formerly placed in the genus Aratinga.

Description 

Both male and female adults of the crimson-fronted parakeet are completely green to yellow with a red cap and bare white ring around its orange eye. Their beaks are a dull orange in color. They have red carpal edges, outer lesser underwing coverts, and bend of their wings. These are also sometimes tinted orange. Their outer greater underwing coverts are yellow, while the inner underwing coverts are green. They may have markings on their thighs.

Juveniles are also the same color as the adults, but have either no or a minimal amount of red on the head, and also lack red patches on the thighs. Their eyes are grey.

Distribution and habitat 
It is found in Nicaragua, Panama, and Costa Rica. It upper elevation limit is 1,600 meters asl.

It is a migratory species.

Behavior and ecology

Breeding 
The parrots' breeding season is in July. The clutch is usually of 3-4 eggs.

Feeding 
It has been observed feeding on wood, an uncommon habit in parrots.

Gallery

References 

Finsch's parakeet
Birds of Nicaragua
Birds of Costa Rica
Birds of Panama
Finsch's parakeet
Finsch's parakeet
Taxonomy articles created by Polbot